Maitland Bar is a remote locality in New South Wales, Australia. It is on the banks of the Meroo River, just north of the gold rush town, Hargraves, New South Wales. One notable character at Maitland Bar is local musician Calvert Makin aka 'Calgooley.'

References

Localities in New South Wales
Towns in the Central West (New South Wales)